Yantus is an extinct town in Logan County, in the U.S. state of West Virginia.

History
A post office called Yantus was established in 1903, and remained in operation until 1937. George Yantis, a local storekeeper and early postmaster, gave the community its name.

References

Ghost towns in West Virginia
Landforms of Logan County, West Virginia